Thomas Cromwell ( – ) was an  English Member of Parliament during the reign of Queen Elizabeth I. His diaries of proceedings in the House of Commons are an important source for historians of parliamentary history during the period when he was a member, and Sir John Neale draws heavily upon them in his ground-breaking two-volume study of Elizabeth I and Her Parliaments (1953–1957).

Family
Thomas Cromwell was the third son of Gregory Cromwell, 1st Baron Cromwell and Elizabeth Seymour, sister to Jane Seymour, third wife of Henry VIII. He was the grandson of statesman Thomas Cromwell, 1st Earl of Essex, chief minister to Henry VIII. Born in around 1540, he was educated at St John's College, Cambridge where he matriculated in 1553.

Career 
Cromwell sat in five successive Parliaments between 1571 and 1589 during the reign of Queen Elizabeth I: for Fowey (1571), Bodmin (1572–1581), Preston (1584–1585) and Grampound (1586-7 and 1589). Gregory Cromwell had been a friend of Sir William Cecil and it may have been Cecil who found Thomas Cromwell his seats at Fowey, Bodmin and Grampound. His return at Preston in 1584 may be accounted for by the patronage of Sir Ralph Sadler, chancellor of the Duchy of Lancaster, who was brought up in the household of Cromwell’s grandfather. He served on numerous Parliamentary committees and, by the end of his career, seems to have been one of the most respected of the independent members and recognised as an authority on Parliamentary procedure. His sympathies were with the Puritan party in the House, but he was considered a moderate. Neale described him as the model type of parliamentarian, deeply versed in the history and procedure of the institution, though lacking in historical perspective; eminently responsible, but fearless in defence of liberty. He was a puritan but his zeal did not cloud his judgment which, with his knowledge of procedure, rendered him one of the most experienced committeemen of his time.

Marriage and issue
Thomas Cromwell married, on 18 August 1580, Katherine (died before 1 August 1616), daughter of Thomas Gardner of Coxford, and by her had 5 sons and 4 daughters.
 Henry Cromwell (c. 14 March 1583 – before 9 December 1629)   
 Humfrey Cromwell (c. 23 June 1586 – )
 Lyonell Cromwell (c. 8 Jan. 1591 – )  
 Thomas Cromwell      
 Gregory Cromwell    
 Ann Cromwell (c. 22 August 1587 – )  
 Susan Cromwell (c. 17 May 1590 – )   
 Katherine Cromwell   
 Mary Cromwell

Death 
After retiring from Parliament, Cromwell resided at King’s Lynn, Norfolk, making his will on 17 February 1610. Cromwell requested that no "pomp or sumptuousness" be used at his funeral, "being not willing to have vanities continued for me after my death, whereto I have been too much subject in my lifetime." He died between February 1610 and April 1611, leaving money and property to his wife "who has always been a most loving wife... and hath besides endured many griefs and sorrows for my sake", to his children, subject to their good behaviour and money to the poor of Great Risborough, Norfolk, and to the poor of the parish where he died.

References

Bibliography

External links
 Cromwell, Thomas (c.1540-c.1611), of King's Lynn, Norf.  A biography

Members of the Parliament of England for Bodmin
Members of the Parliament of England for Fowey
Members of the Parliament of England for Grampound
1540 births
1611 deaths
Thomas
17th-century English people
English MPs 1571
English MPs 1572–1583
English MPs 1584–1585
English MPs 1586–1587
English MPs 1589
Alumni of St John's College, Cambridge
Younger sons of barons